Although Herodotus and Xenophon referred to the entire region as Susiana, the name Khuzestan is what has been referred to the southwesternmost province of Persia (Iran) from antiquity.

Etymology

In some instances, sugar and sugar cane have been given as the meaning of Khuz. The fertile soil of Khuzestan has optimal potential for growing this plant, making excellent harvests for sugar cane possible here.

However, most experts believe the name Khuzestan to be derived from Khūzī, the name of the original Elamite people who inhabited the region, whose distinctive language reportedly survived until Sassanid times.

Every author of the early Islamic period, whether Arabic, Persian, or African, referred to the entire region as Ahvaz.  The word "Khuzestan", however, seems to have been widely used to refer to the region by the 9th century.

Some scholars believe Ahvaz and Khuzestan are related to the name Ooksin, a city established during the era of the Elamite civilization, and are the altered forms of the words Ooks, Ookz, Hookz, Huz and Khuz. Iraj Afshar in his Nigāhī bih Khūzistān : majmū`ah´ī az awzā`-i tārīkhī, jughrāfiyā'ī, ijtimā`i, iqtisādī-i mintaqah states that Uxi was the Greek counterpart of the Elamite word Ūvja.

According to Jules Oppert, the word Ūvja, was pronounced as Xuz or Khuz in the Elamite language. The word Ūvja appears abundantly in many texts and on Achaemenid inscriptions at Naqsh-e Rustam, and on Darius's epigraphs at Persepolis and Susa among others Ūvja, or its Greek counterpart Uxi, were names used to refer to the land or the peoples inhabiting the land of Khuzestan.

Furthermore, Ibn Nadeem, in his book al-Fihrist, mentions that all the Median and Persian lands of antiquity spoke one language. In his book  he quotes the Abdullah Ibn al-Muqaffa:

"The Iranian languages are Fahlavi, Dari, Khuzi, Persian, and Suryani."

He then adds that Khuzi is the unofficial language of the royalty and comes from Khuzestan.

In Majma-ul-Tawarikh wa al-Qesas ("The Collection of histories and Tales") written in 1126CE, Khuzestan appears with such names as Hajuestan, Hobujestan, and Ajar, which seem to be derived from Hobujestan and Hujestan in Pahlavi language. .

The Old Persian  word Hūjiya "Elam" appears abundantly in many texts and on Achaemenid inscriptions at Naqsh-e Rustam, and on Darius's epigraphs at Persepolis and Susa among others Hūjiya, or its Greek counterpart Uxi, were names used to refer to the land or the peoples inhabiting Susiana. In Middle Persian, Hūjiya "Elam, Susiana Province" became Huź "Susiana", and the modern form of this word is Xuz. As with istan, the common Persian ending -stan "land, region" was added at some point. The Old Persian: Grammar, Texts, Lexicon by Roland G. Kent of the American Oriental Society, lists the following chains of derivation:

Ūvja → Awaz → Xuz
Ūvja → Ux → Xuz
Ūvja → Xuz → Hobuj
Ūvja → Hobuj → Xuz → Hoz
Ūvja → Hobuj → Xuz → Hoz → Ahvaz

Whereas in some Iranian dialects such as Luri and Bakhtiari (also based in and around Khuzestan), the sound "h" is sometimes used for pronouncing Kh, the words oo, hoo and Khuz have in the process of time been added to the suffix -estan, and the word oojestan has gradually changed to Hujestan, forming the word Khuzestan. Such conversions derive from the fact that in ancient Persian dialects and in Pahlavi language, the sound "oo" was changeable to "hoo" as in such words like Oormazd → Hoormazd or Ooshmand → Hooshmand. And Hoordad has also been pronounced Khordad and Khoortat.

Arabistan
Most Arabs such as the Bani Kaab tribe, came from the west and southwest of the Tigris and Euphrates outside of Khuzestan, beginning in the 15-16th centuries. During the succeeding centuries many more Arab tribes moved from southern Iraq to Khuzestan; as a result, Khuzestan gained the second name Arabistan, and became extensively Arabized.

In 1441, Muhammad ibn Falah, founder and leader of the Msha'sha'iya, initiated a wave of attacks on Khuzestan, and the cities of Hoveizeh, Khorramshahr, Ahvaz, and Susa started seeing large increases in Arab populations. The term Arabistan thus came into use to refer to the Arab populated areas of this region. At this time, many texts started using both Khuzestan and Arabistan as the region's name. Examples are Majalis Al-Mumineen written by Ghadhi Nurollah Shushtari in 1585, Giti Gosha by Mirza Muhammad Sadigh Musawi, Nasikh Al-Tawarikh by Lisan Malek Sepehr, Muntazam Naseri and Mar'at ul-Baladan by Sani ol molk, Sharh Waghi'a by Ismail Mirza Dorughi, and the Afsharid era work Jahan goshay-i Naderi. The Safavid era account History of Alam Aray Abbasi speaks of dispatching troops to "Khuzestan wa Arabistan" during the 8th year of Shah Abbas' reign.

The name Arabistan, however, became more prevalent over time as the British became gradually involved in the Persian Gulf region. By the time of the Qajar Mozaffareddin Shah, the name Arabistan was meant to completely refer to all of Khuzestan.

With the centralized Pahlavi government of Iran gradually strengthening, Reza Shah restored the name of the province to its original in 1923.

Supporting documentation

The following is a list of sources that specifically use, describe, or discuss the word "Khuzestan". Almost all are written in the Arabic language.

9th century and before
Khwarizmi's Mafatih Al-ulum.
The poetry of Al-Muzraji ibn Kulab, 699. (المضرجي بن کلاب)
Al-masalik wa al-mamalik by Abul Qasim Ubaidullah ibn Abdullah ibn Khurdad-bih a.k.a. Istakhri, 864.
I'laq al-nafisah (اعلاق النفيسه) by Abu Ali Ahmad ibn Umar ibn Rasteh, 902.
Kitab al-kharaj by Qudamah ibn Ja'far, 879.
Mukhtasar Kitab ul Baladan (مختصر کتاب البلدان) by Ahmad ibn al-Faqih Hamadani a.k.a. Ibn al-Faqih.
Ajayib Al-aqalim Al-sab'ah (عجايب الاقاليم السبعه) by Ibn Sarabiyun d.945.
Tarikh al-Yaqubi by the famous historian Al-Yaqubi.
Sahih Bukhari
Al-risalah Al-Wasiyah by Ala ul-dowlah Semnani, a mysticism treatise.

10th century
Ferdowsi's Shahnameh
Sowar al-Aqalim Masalik al-Mamalik (صور الاقاليم - مسالک الممالک) by Ahmad ibn Sahl Al-balkhi 920.
Surat ul-Ardh (صوره العرض) by Ibn Hawqal, 977.
Ahsan al-Taqasim fi Ma'rifat il-Aqalim (احسن التقاسيم في معرفه الاقاليم) by Shamsideen Abu Abdallah Muhammad ibn Ahmad ibn Abu Bakr Al-Shami, a.k.a. Al-Muqaddasi, 985.
Moruj ul-dhahab wa ma'adin al-jawahir (مروج الذهب و معادن الجواهر) written in 943 by Masudi.
Masudi's Al-tanbih wa al-ashraf (التنبیه و الاشراف).
Hodud ul-'alam min al-mashriq ila al-maqrib (حدود العالم من المشرق الی المغرب) written by an unknown author in 982.
Al-risalah al-thaniyah by Abu Dalf mas'ar ibn muhalhal (ابو دلف مسعر بن مهلهل).
Tabari's Akhbar al-rusul wa al-muluk, 922.
Tajarib al-umam by Ibn Miskawayh.
Tajarib al-umam by Abu Shuja. d1002.

11th century
Nizam al-Mulk's famous Siyasat Nama.
The famous Tarikh al-Yamini by Muhammad ibn Abdul-jabbar Otbi (محمد عبد الجبار عتبی), d1305.
The Canon of Medicine by Avicenna

12th century
Nizami Ganjavi's works.
Majmal al-Tawarikh wa al-Qasas (مجمل التواریخ و القصص) written in 1126 by an unknown author.
al-Ansab (الانساب) by Abu Saeed Abdulkarim al-Tamimi al-Sama'ani, written in 1166.
Rahat al-Sodur wa Ayat al-Sorur (راحه الصدور و آیه السرور) by Najmideen Abubakr al-Rawandi, in 1173.
Ajayib al-Makhluqat (عجایب المخلوقات) by Muhammad ibn Mahmud ibn Ahmad al-Tusi.
Fars Nama by Ibn Balkhi, 1116.
Tadhkirat ul-Awliya by Farid al-Din Attar.

13th century
Wafiyat al-A'yan wa anba' ul-Zaman (وفیات الاعیان و انبا الزمان) by Abul Abbas Shamsuddin Ahmad Khalkan a.k.a. Ibn Khalkan, written in 1282.
Al-mu'arrib (المعرب) by Abu Mansur Marhub ibn Ahmad ibn Muhammad ibn Khizr ibn Hasan ibn Jawalighi Al-Baghdadi, d1247.
Mujem al-baladan (معجم البلدان) written in 1226 by Yaqut al-Hamawi.
al-Mushtarak wadh'āa wa al-Muftaraq Sa'qāa (المشترک وضعا و المفترق صعقا), also by Yaqut al-Hamawi.
Athar al-Bilad wa Akhbar al-Ibad (آثار البلاد و اخبار العباد) by Zakariya ibn Muhammad ibn Mahmud al-Qazwini.
Uyun al-Anba' fi Tabaqat al-Atba''' (عیون الانبا فی طبقات الاطبا), by Ibn Abi Asiba'ah, written in 1230.Al-Kamil fi Tarikh by Ibn al-AthirSirat Jalaliddin Minakbarni by Shahabiddin Muhammad Nasawi.Tarikh-i Jahangushay-i Juvaini by Ata-Malik Juvayni.Tarikh Shahi Gharakhtaian by an unknown author.Tarikh Mukhtasar al-Dawal (تاریخ مختصر الدول) by Ibn 'Ibri.

14th centuryLisan ul-Arab (لسان العرب) by Muhammad ibn Mukrim ibn Ali ibn Ahmad Ansari Ifriqi Misri aka Ibn Manzur d1311.Diwan Nizari by the Ismaili poet Nizari Quhistani, d1320.Taqwim al-Buldan (تقویم البلدان) by Imad al-Din Ismail ibn Ali ibn Mahmud, a copy of which was printed by Reinaud in 1848.Nezhat ol-Qolub by Hamdollah Mostowfi.Tarikh Gozideh, also by Hamdollah Mostowfi.Suwar al-Aqalim (صور الاقالیم) by unknown author. Written in 1347, this geographic treatise was dedicated to the Muzaffarid ruler Amir Mubarizeddin Muhammad.Marasid al-Ittila' ila Asma' al-Imkanah wa al-Bagha' (مراصد الاطلاع الی اسما الامکنه و البقاع) by Safideen Abdulmumin al-Baghdadi.Nukhbat ul-Dahr fi Ajayib al-Bir wa al-Bahr (نخبه الدهر و فی عجائب البر و البحر) by Shaikh Shamsuddin Abi Abdullah Muhammad ibn Abitalib al-Ansari, a copy of which was printed in 1928 by A. Meher in Leipzig.Tarikh Fakhri by Safiddin Muhammad ibn Ali a.k.a. Ibn Taghtaghi, written in 1301.Jami' al-Tawarikh by Rashid-al-Din Hamadani.Rawdhah Ulā al-Albab fi Marifah al-Tawarikh wa al-Ansab (روضه اولی الالباب فی معرفه التواریخ و الانساب) by Fakhriddin Abu Suleiman Dawud al-Banakuti, written in 1317.Shiraz nama by Abul Abbas Mo'in-uddin Ahmad Shirazi, written in 1356.Tabaqat al-Shafi'iyah al-Kubra (طبقات الشافعیه الکبری) by Tajiddin Abi Nasr Abdul wahab ibn Ali ibn Abdul Kafi Asbaki a.k.a. Ibn Sabki, d1326.

15th centuryAl-Qamus Almuhit (القاموس المحيط) by Muhammad ibn Yaqub ibn Muhammad Firouzabadi, d1414.Kitab al-ibr by Ibn KhaldunZafar nama by Sharafiddin Ali Yazdi.Anis ul-nas (انیس الناس) by Shuja', written in 1426.Majmal al-Tawarikh (مجمل التواریخ) by Faish-iddin Ahmad, written in 1441.Matla al-Sa'dayn wa Majma' al-Bahrain (مطلع السعدین و مجمع البحرین) by kamaliddin Abdal-razzaq Samaqandi, d1482.

16th centurySharaf nama by Abul Barakat Muniri, 1596.Lubab ul-Albab by Zahiriddin Nasr Muhammad Aufi.Habib ul-Sayr fi Akhbar Afrad Bashar (حبیب السیر فی اخبار افراد بشر) by Khandmir, written in 1520 by for Khajah Habibullah Savoji.Ahsan al-Tawarikh by Hasan Beyk Romlu, d1577.Tafawut al-Athar fi dhikr al-ikhyar (تفاوه الآثار فی ذکر الاخیار) by Mahmud ibn Hidayat al-Natanzi, written in 1589.Sharaf nama by Amir Ashraf-khan Badilisi, written in 1596.

17th centuryMajma 'ul-Bahrain wa Matla 'ul Nayrein (مجمع البحرين و مطلع النيرين) by Fakhroddin ibn Muhammad ibn Ali Tarihi, d1674.Farhang Burhan Qati' (فرهنگ برهان قاطع) by Muhammad Husayn ibn Khalaf Tabrizi of India, 1672.Jami' Mufidi by Muhammad Mufid Mostowfi Bafghi, written in 1066.Firdaws dar Tarikh Shushtar by Ala'ul Mulk Husayni Shushtari Mar'ashi.Khulasat al-Baladan (خلاصه البلدان) written by Safiddin Muhammad ibn Hashim Husayni Qumi, in 1668.

18th century and afterTaj al-Arus Min Jawahir al-Qamus (تاج العروس من جواهر القاموس) by Muhammad ibn Muhammad ibn Abdul-razzaq Hussayni Yamani Zubaidy, 1790.Farhang Anandraj (فرهنگ آنندراج) by Muhammad Padhsha ibn Ghulam Muhyiddin, India, 1888.Lughat Nama of Ali Akbar Dehkhoda.Haqayiq al-Akhbar Naseri (حقایق الاخبار ناصری) by Mirza Sayyid Jafar.Dareh Na Darreh (دره نا دره) by Mirza Mehdi Khan Astarabadi, d1759.Da'irat ul-Ma'arif al-Qarn al-Rabi' al-Ashar (دائره المعارف القرن الرابع العشر) by Muhammad farid Mustafa Wajdi, b1878.

See also
Khuzestan
Ahvaz
Iran
Arabs of Khuzestan
Timeline of the name Palestine
History of the name Azerbaijan

References

Further references used
 Najafī, Muhammad Bāqir. Khuzistan dar manabi' Iran-shinasi. Tehran. 1983. Library of The National Museum of Iran. This study documents in 5 chapters and 162 pages, the sources of the names Khuzestan and Ahvaz'' in the most extensive detail.
Encyclopædia Iranica

Khuzestan Province
Khuzestan
Khuzestan